Georgina Nkrumah Aboah (born 2 June 1959) is a member of the Parliament of Ghana, representing for Asikuma-Odoben-Brakwa in the Central region.

Personal life 
Georgina is married with two children. She is a Christian (Methodist).

Early life and education 
Georgina was born on 2 June 1959 in Breman-Brakwa in the Central region.

Education 
She did her diploma at the University of Ghana in 1990–1992.

She attended University of Education, Winneba in 2000-2008 where she had B' Education in Educational Administration. She further obtained M' Edu in Guidance and Counselling in 2008–2010.

Politics 
She is a member of the National Democratic Congress.

She was a member of parliament for Asikuma-Odoben Brakwa Constituency in the Central Region.

She was a committee member of Business, Gender and Children, Health.

Employment 
She is an educationist. She was the Coordinator in charge of SHS at the Tema Metropolitan Office of the GES. She was the DCE for Asikuma-Odoben-Brakwa District from 30 April 2009- January, 2013.

References 

1959 births
Living people
National Democratic Congress (Ghana) politicians
University of Education, Winneba alumni
University of Ghana alumni
Women members of the Parliament of Ghana